Erik Martin (12 January 1936 in Neuss – 25 April 2017) was a German writer, songwriter and composer of songs. He was the founder and editor of the literature and art magazine Muschelhaufen.

Life and work
Erik Martin was the first-born son of Illa and Ernst J. Martin – both  dentists and dendrologists; they were the founders of the Sequoiafarm Kaldenkirchen. His sister is the tree-and-bush expert Helge Breloer. Martin grew up in Kaldenkirchen, went to Aloisiuskolleg in Bad Godesberg and graduated at Thomaeum High-School Kempen. After studies in Aachen he worked as a teacher of German and Biology in Viersen, where he created schoolgardens and worked out environmental projects joining the German Waldjugend. In 1997 he received the Klaus-Gundelach-Prize for his merits concerning his environmental protection and his youth novel Fjellwanderung.

From 1969 to 2008 Erik Martin edited Muschelhaufen, an annual for literature and graphics. In numerous special editions he helped  recover writers such as Albert Vigoleis Thelen, Margot Scharpenberg or Fritz Grasshoff. Stories and Poems by well-known writers such as Ernst Jandl, Annemarie Schimmel (honoured with the Peace Prize of the German Book Trade), Günter Kunert, Siegfried Lenz, Christoph Meckel and James Krüss were first published in Muschelhaufen. Artists like Elke Rehder or Clemens Weiss used to work for the magazine.
With great care Martin studied Werner Helwig's books and wrote essential essays on his work.

Martin's songs are well-known and often sung in the groups of the German Youth Movement, the German folk and the German Scout Movement. One of those is the popular Wenn der Abend naht (When the evening comes)
. As youth leader for many years Martin led groups to whose members he was known as Mac. Up to this day he participates in the Deutsche Waldjugend activities and has written articles for several magazines, e.g. der eisbrecher, scouting and Fang. Two CDs with Martin's songs were edited by the Waldjugend.

Erik Martin was married. He had two sons and lived in Viersen-Dülken.

Publications

 Macs Fahrtenbuch (1971)
 Vom Singen in den Gruppen (1981)
 Waldläuferheft für Nordlandfahrer und Liederfreunde (1982)
 Liederblätter deutscher Jugend. Vol. 27 (1984). 
 Fjellwanderung. Novel. (1986). 
 Das kleine Grenzwaldbuch (= Muschelhaufen. Vol. 24/25-1987/88). 
 Werner Helwig. Special edition Muschelhaufen. Vol. 26A (1991). 
 Die schwierigen Jahre. Biography. (1995). 
 Etwas andere Geschichten zum Vorlesen (1996)
 Wenn der Abend naht. Lieder von Mac. CD. (1996 and 2000)
 Heut wird die Hexe verbrannt. CD. (2006)

Notes

Further reading
 Bernd Gerhard: Mac zum Sechzigsten. In: der eisbrecher. No. 1/96. Verlag der Jugendbewegung, Witzenhausen 1996, 
 Michael Buselmeier: Hungerphasen, Wandervögel. In: Frankfurter Rundschau, 8 April 2000
 Ursula Prause: Muschelhaufen und Dünenschutt / Erik Martin und Werner Helwig. In: Muschelhaufen. Jahresschrift für Literatur und Graphik. Vol. 47/48. Viersen 2007, 
 Markus Orths: Abschied vom Muschelhaufen. In: Am Erker. Zeitschrift für Literatur. No. 53. Daedalus, Münster 2007,

External links
 
 Official website 
 Official website Muschelhaufen 
 Iris Linke: Mac (Erik Martin) – Leben und Lieder (MS Word; 74 kB) 
 Erik Martin: Wenn der Abend naht. Original version, sung by the Waldjugend 
 Erik Martin: Wenn der Abend naht. Song versions on YouTube
 Erik Martin in: NRW Literatur im Netz 

20th-century German novelists
21st-century German novelists
German songwriters
German schoolteachers
German conservationists
People from Viersen
1936 births
2017 deaths